Alexius Meinong Ritter von Handschuchsheim (17 July 1853 – 27 November 1920) was an Austrian philosopher, a realist known for his unique ontology. He also made contributions to philosophy of mind and theory of value.

Life
Alexius Meinong's father was officer Anton von Meinong (1799–1870), who was granted the hereditary title of Ritter in 1851 and reached the rank of Major General in 1858 before retiring in 1859.

From 1868 to 1870, Meinong studied at the Akademisches Gymnasium, Vienna. In 1870, he entered the University of Vienna law school where he was drawn to Carl Menger's lectures on economics. In summer 1874, he earned a doctorate in history by writing a thesis on Arnold of Brescia. It was during the winter term (1874–1875) that he began to focus on history and philosophy. Meinong became a pupil of Franz Brentano, who was then a recent addition to the philosophical faculty. Meinong would later claim that his mentor did not directly influence his shift into philosophy, though he did acknowledge that during that time Brentano may have helped him improve his progress in philosophy. Meinong studied under Brentano with Edmund Husserl, who would also become a notable and influential philosopher. Both their works exhibited parallel developments, particularly from 1891 to 1904. Both are recognized for their respective contribution to philosophical research.

In 1882, Meinong became a professor at the University of Graz and was later promoted as Chair of its Philosophy department. During his tenure, he founded the Graz Psychological Institute (Grazer Psychologische Institut; founded in 1894) and the Graz School of experimental psychology. Meinong supervised the doctorates of Christian von Ehrenfels (founder of Gestalt psychology) and Adalbert Meingast, as well as the habilitation of Alois Höfler and Anton Oelzelt-Newin.

Work

Ontology

Meinong wrote two early essays on David Hume, the first dealing with his theory of abstraction, the second with his theory of relations, and was relatively strongly influenced by British empiricism. He is most noted, however, for his edited book Theory of Objects (full title: Investigations in Theory of Objects and Psychology, 1904), which grew out of his work on intentionality and his belief in the possibility of intending nonexistent objects. Whatever can be the target of a mental act, Meinong calls an "object."

His theory of objects, now known as "Meinongian object theory," is based around the purported empirical observation that it is possible to think about something, such as a golden mountain, even though that object does not exist. Since we can refer to such things, they must have some sort of being.  Meinong thus distinguishes the "being" of a thing, in virtue of which it may be an object of thought, from a thing's "existence", which is the substantive ontological status ascribed to—for example—horses but not to unicorns.  Meinong called such nonexistent objects "homeless"; others have nicknamed their place of residence "Meinong's jungle" because of their great number and exotic nature.

Historically, Meinong has been treated, especially by Gilbert Ryle, as an eccentric whose theory of objects was allegedly dealt a severe blow in Bertrand Russell's essay "On Denoting" (1905) (see Russellian view).  However, Russell himself thought highly of the vast majority of Meinong's work and, until formulating his theory of descriptions, held similar views about nonexistent objects. Further, recent Meinongians such as Terence Parsons and Roderick Chisholm have established the consistency of a Meinongian theory of objects, while others (e.g., Karel Lambert) have defended the uselessness of such a theory.

Meinong is also seen to be controversial in the field of philosophy of language for holding the view that "existence" is merely a property of an object, just as color or mass might be a property. Closer readers of his work, however, accept that Meinong held the view that objects are "indifferent to being" and that they stand "beyond being and non-being". On this view Meinong is expressly denying that existence is a property of an object. For Meinong, what an object is, its real essence, depends on the properties of the object. These properties are genuinely possessed whether the object exists or not, and so existence cannot be a mere property of an object.

Types of objects
Meinong holds that objects can be divided into three categories on the basis of their ontological status. Objects may have one of the following three modalities of being and non-being:
 Existence (Existenz, verb: existieren), or actual reality (Wirklichkeit), which denotes the material and temporal being of an object
 Subsistence (Bestand, verb: bestehen), which denotes the being of an object in a non-temporal sense.
 Absistence or being-given (Gegebenheit, as in the German use es gibt, i.e. "there are", "it is given"), which denotes being an object but not having being.

Certain objects can exist (mountains, birds, etc.); others cannot in principle ever exist, such as the objects of mathematics (numbers, theorems, etc.): such objects simply subsist. Finally, a third class of objects cannot even subsist, such as impossible objects (e.g. square circle, wooden iron, etc.). Being-given is not a minimal mode of being, because it is not a mode of being at all. Rather, to be "given" is just to be an object. Being-given, termed "absistence" by J. N. Findlay, is better thought of as a mode of non-being than as a mode of being. Absistence, unlike existence and subsistence, does not have a negation; everything absists. (Note that all objects absist, while some subset of these subsist, of which a yet-smaller subset exist.) The result that everything absists allows Meinong to deal with our ability to affirm the non-being (Nichtsein) of an object. Its absistence is evidenced by our act of intending it, which is logically prior to our denying that it has being.

Object and subject
Meinong distinguishes four classes of "objects":
 Object (Objekt), which can be real (like horses) or ideal (like the concepts of difference, identity, etc.)
Objectives are close to what contemporary philosophers call states of affairs (where these may be actual—may "obtain"—or not)
 Dignitative, e.g. the true, the good, the beautiful
 Desiderative, e.g. duties, ends, etc.

To these four classes of objects correspond four classes of psychological acts:
 (Re)presentation (das Vorstellen), for objects
 Thought (das Denken), for the objectives
 Feeling (das Fühlen), for dignitatives
 Desire (das Begehren), for the desideratives

Bibliography

Books
 Meinong, A. (1885). Über philosophische Wissenschaft und ihre Propädeutik.
 Meinong, A. (1894). Psychologisch-ethische Untersuchungen zur Werttheorie.
 Meinong, A. (1902). Über Annahmen, 1st ed.
 Meinong, A., ed. (1904). Untersuchungen zur Gegenstandstheorie und Psychologie (Investigations in Theory of Objects and Psychology), Leipzig: Barth (contains Alexius Meinong, "Über Gegenstandstheorie", pp. 1–51).
 Meinong, A. (1910). Über Annahmen, 2nd ed.
 Meinong, A. (1915). Über Möglichkeit und Wahrscheinlichkeit.
 Meinong, A. (1917). Über emotionale Präsentation.

Articles
 Meinong, A. (1877). "Hume Studien I. Zur Geschichte und Kritik des modernen Nominalismus", in Sitzungsbereiche der phil.-hist. Classe der kais. Akademie der Wissenschaften, 78:185–260.
 Meinong, A. (1882). "Hume Studien II. Zur Relationstheorie", in Sitzungsbereiche der phil.-hist. Classe der kais. Akademie der Wissenschaften, 101:573–752.
 Meinong, A. (1891). "Zur psychologie der Komplexionen und Relationen", in Zeitschrift für Psychologie und Physiologie der Sinnesorgane, II:245–265.
 Meinong, A. (1899). "Über Gegenstände höherer Ordnung und deren Verhältniss zur inneren Wahrnehmung", in Zeitschrift für Psychologie und Physiologie der Sinnesorgane, 21, pp. 187–272.

Books together with other authors
 Höfler, A., & Meinong, A. (1890). Philosophische Propädeutik. Erster Theil: Logik. F. Tempsky / G. Freytag, Vienna.

Posthumously edited works
 Haller, R., Kindinger, R., and Chisholm, R., editors (1968–78). Gesamtausgabe, 7 vols., Akademische Druck- und Verlagsanstalt, Graz.
 Meinong, A. (1965). Philosophenbriefe, ed. Kindinger, R., Akademische Druck- und Verlagsanstalt, Graz.

English translations
 On Assumptions (Über Annahmen), trans. James Heanue. Berkeley: University of California Press, 1983.
 On Emotional Presentation (Über emotionale Präsentation), trans. M.-L. Schubert Kalsi. Evanston, Ill: Northwestern University Press, 1972.
 "The Theory of Objects" ("Über Gegenstandstheorie"), trans. I. Levi, D. B. Terrell, and R. Chisholm. In Realism and the Background of Phenomenology, ed. Roderick Chisholm. Atascadero, CA: Ridgeview, 1981, pp. 76–117.

See also
 Modal Meinongianism
 On the Content and Object of Presentations by Kazimierz Twardowski

Notes

Further reading

Books
 Albertazzi, L., Jacquette, D., and Poli, R., editors (2001). The School of Alexius Meinong.  Aldershot: Ashgate. 
 Bergmann, G. Realism: A Critique of Brentano and Meinong. Madison, Wisconsin: University of Wisconsin Press, 1967.
 Chisholm, R.  Brentano and Meinong Studies. Amsterdam: Rodopi,  1982.
 Dölling, E.  Wahrheit Suchen und Wahrheit Bekennen. Alexius Meinong: Skizze seines Lebens.  Amsterdam: Rodopi, 1999. 
 Findlay, J. N.  Meinong's Theory of Objects and Values, 2nd ed. Oxford: Clarendon Press, 1963.
 Grossman, R.  Meinong. London and Boston: Routledge & Kegan Paul,  1974. 
 Haller, R., editor.  Jenseits von Sein und Nichtsein. Graz: Akademische Druck- und Verlagsanstalt,  1972.
 Lindenfeld, D. F. The Transformation of Positivism: Alexius Meinong and European Thought, 1880–1920. Berkeley: University of California Press, 1980. 
 Rollinger, R. D. Meinong and Husserl on Abstraction and Universals. Number XX in Studien zur Österreichischen Philosophie. Amsterdam and Atlanta: Rodopi, 1993.  
 Rollinger, Robin D.  Austrian Phenomenology: Brentano, Husserl, Meinong, and Others on Mind and Object. Frankfurt am Main: Ontos, 2008. 
 Routley, R. (1982). Exploring Meinong's Jungle and Beyond. Ridgeview Pub Co. . (Also published by the Research School of Social Sciences, Australian National University, Canberra, 1979.)
 Schubert Kalsi, Marie-Luise. Alexius Meinong:  On Objects of Higher Order and Husserl's Phenomenology. Martinus Nijhoff, The Hague, Netherlands. 
 Smith, Barry. Austrian Philosophy: The Legacy of Franz Brentano. Chicago: Open Court, 1996.

Articles
 Chrudzimski, A. (2005). "Abstraktion und Relationen beim jungen Meinong" in [Schramm, 2005], pages 7–62.
 Dölling, E. (2005). "Eine semiotische Sicht auf Meinongs Annahmenlehre" in [Schramm, 2005], pages 129–158.
 Kenneth, B. (1970). "Meinong’s Hume Studies. Part I: Meinong’s Nominalism" in Philosophy and Phenomenological Research, 30:550–567.
 Kenneth, B. (1971). "Meinong’s Hume Studies. Part II: Meinong’s Analysis of Relations" in PPR, 31:564–584.
 Rollinger, R. D. (2005). "Meinong and Brentano". In [Schramm, 2005], pages 159–197.
 Routley, R. and Valerie Routley. "Rehabilitating Meinong's Theory of Objects". Review Internationale de Philosophie 104–105 (1973).
Russell, Bertrand. "Meinong's Theory of Complexes and Assumptions" in Essays in Analysis, ed. Douglas Lackey. New York: George Braziller, 1973.
 Ryle, Gilbert. "Intentionality-Theory and the Nature of Thinking." Review Internationale de Philosophie 104–105 (1973).
 Schermann, H. (1972). "Husserls II. Logische Untersuchung und Meinongs Hume-Studien I" in [Haller, 1972], pages 103–116.
 Vendrell-Ferran, I. (2009): "Meinongs Philosophie der Gefühle und ihr Einfluss auf die Grazer Schule" in Meinong Studien III Graz

Journals
 Schramm, A., editor. Meinong Studies – Meinong Studien, Volume 1 (2005). Ontos Verlag.

Podcasts
 The philosopher A. C. Grayling discusses Meinong in a podcast about Bertrand Russell's theory of descriptions on Philosophy Bites.

External links
 
 Alexius Meinong's Theory of Objects
 Alexius Meinong: Editions, Translations, Bibliographic Resources
 
 Alexius Meinong's page on the Mathematics Genealogy Project

1853 births
1920 deaths
19th-century Austrian writers
19th-century essayists
20th-century Austrian philosophers
20th-century Austrian writers
20th-century essayists
Abstract object theory
Austrian essayists
Austrian knights
Austrian Roman Catholics
Catholic philosophers
Continental philosophers
Epistemologists
Metaphysicians
Ontologists
People from the Kingdom of Galicia and Lodomeria
Philosophers of history
Philosophers of language
Philosophers of mind
Philosophers of psychology
Philosophy academics
Philosophy writers
Academic staff of the University of Graz
University of Vienna alumni
Writers from Lviv